Sunshine is an unincorporated community in Hamilton County, Texas, United States.

References 

Unincorporated communities in Texas
Unincorporated communities in Hamilton County, Texas